Qāsim ibn Muḥammad was the eldest of the sons of Muhammad and Khadija bint Khuwaylid. He died in 601 CE (before the start of his father's prophethood in 609), after his third birthday and is buried in Jannat al-Mu'alla cemetery, Mecca.

Siblings

Abd Allah ibn Muhammad
Ibrahim ibn Muhammad
Zainab bint Muhammad
Ruqayya bint Muhammad
Umm Kulthum bint Muhammad
Fatimah al-Zahra

References

External links 
 The tribe of Quraish

Children of Muhammad
598 births
601 deaths
Arab Muslims
6th-century Arabs
People from Mecca
Burials at Jannat al-Mu'alla

Child deaths